Donald Sinclair may refer to:

Donald Sinclair (hotel owner) (1909–1981), owner of the Gleneagles Hotel in Torquay and the inspiration for the character Basil Fawlty in Fawlty Towers
Donald Sinclair (veterinary surgeon) (1911–1995), inspiration for the character Siegfried Farnon in James Herriot's novels and their film and TV adaptations All Creatures Great and Small
Donald Sinclair (Ontario politician) (1829–1900), Canadian politician
Donald Sinclair (diplomat), former Canadian ambassador to Israel
Donald Sinclair (Minnesota politician) (1899-1978), American farmer and politician